The Confederation presidential primary, 2020 was held from November 2019 to January 2020 to decide the coalition's nominee for the 2020 presidential election. It was the first organized presidential primary in Poland since the 2010 Civic Platform presidential primary and the first with an advanced format featuring an American-style delegate system.

Candidates

First round

December 07, 2019: Podlaskie Voivodeship

December 07, 2019: Warmian-Masurian Voivodeship

December 08, 2019: Pomeranian Voivodeship

December 08, 2019: Kuyavian-Pomeranian Voivodeship

December 14, 2019: Masovian Voivodeship

December 14, 2019: Świętokrzyskie Voivodeship

December 15, 2019: Podkarpackie Voivodeship

December 15, 2019: Lublin Voivodeship

January 04, 2020: Lesser Poland Voivodeship

January 04, 2020: Silesian Voivodeship

January 05, 2020: Opole Voivodeship

January 05, 2020: Lower Silesian Voivodeship

January 11, 2020: Łódź Voivodeship

January 11, 2020: Greater Poland Voivodeship

January 12, 2020: Lubusz Voivodeship

January 12, 2020: West Pomeranian Voivodeship

Primary election results

Candidates

Parties

Convention

Results were announced during a convention which took place on January 18 in Warsaw. The winner was Krzysztof Bosak.

See also
2020 Polish presidential election

References

2020 elections in Poland
Primary elections in Poland
Confederation Liberty and Independence
2020 Polish presidential election
2019 elections in Poland